Kang Ha-neul (born Kim Ha-neul on February 21, 1990) is a South Korean actor. He is best known for his roles in television dramas The Heirs (2013), Misaeng: Incomplete Life (2014), Moon Lovers: Scarlet Heart Ryeo (2016), When the Camellia Blooms (2019), and Insider (2022) ; and the films Mourning Grave (2014), Twenty (2015), Dongju: The Portrait of a Poet (2016), New Trial (2017), Midnight Runners (2017), Forgotten (2017), and The Pirates: The Last Royal Treasure (2022).

In 2020, Kang received the Baeksang Arts Award for Best Actor – Television and ranked 23rd in Forbes Korea Power Celebrity annual list.

Career
Kang began his career in musical theatre, notably in Thrill Me (2010), Prince Puzzle (2011), Black Mary Poppins (2012), and Assassins (2012). He later shifted to the screen, starring in the television dramas To the Beautiful You (2012), The Heirs (2013) and Misaeng: Incomplete Life (2014).<ref name

2015 was a busy year for Kang as he appeared in three films; musical film C'est si bon, period film Empire of Lust, and coming-of-age film Twenty, for which he managed to clinch several Best New Actor awards and nominations.

In 2016, Kang starred in the black and white biographical period film Dongju: The Portrait of a Poet, where he played the titular role of poet Yun Dong-ju. His role as Yun Dong-ju earned him Best Actor nominations at the 25th Buil Film Awards and 4th Wildflower Film Awards. He also appeared in the romantic comedy film Like for Likes, playing a young songwriter who suffers a hearing disability. The same year, he co-starred in the historical drama Moon Lovers: Scarlet Heart Ryeo, playing the role of 8th Prince Wang Wook, which earned him an Excellence Award at the 2016 SBS Drama Awards.

In 2017, Kang starred in the film New Trial, acting as a young man who spent a decade in prison after an abusive investigation for a crime he did not commit. He then starred alongside Park Seo-joon in the action comedy film Midnight Runners, playing a nerdy student of the Korean National Police University. The film was a success, becoming the 4th highest-grossing South Korean film in 2017. In the same year, he also appeared in mystery thriller film Forgotten  alongside Kim Mu-yeol.

In September 2018, Kang co-starred with fellow actor Ji Chang-wook and K-Pop idol Kim Sung-kyu from Infinite in military musical Shinheung Military Academy. The musical is regarded as one of the largest productions of the Republic of Korea Army, with cumulative audiences recorded totaling to 110,000 viewers. Kang's performance as Paldo has earned him a nomination for Best Actor at the 7th Yegreen Musical Awards.

In 2019, Kang made a comeback in the entertainment industry in the KBS2 TV series When the Camellia Blooms alongside Gong Hyo-jin. The drama achieved impressive ratings, and was the highest-rated miniseries in 2019. It also led to numerous accolades and critical acclaim for Kang, including the Baeksang Arts Award for Best Actor – Television.

In November 2019, Kang's contract with SEM Company, his agency since 2010 expired and he joined his former manager in the newly established entertainment agency, TH Company. In January 2020, Kang returned to theater in Fantasy Tale, which marked his comeback performance after Harold and Maude in 2015.

In 2021, Kang made his comeback to the silver screen with Waiting for Rain, playing the role of Young Ho, a man who lives his life aimlessly while exchanging letters with his lover. The same year he was confirmed to star in the mystery thriller film Streaming in which Kang's character runs a popular YouTube channel based on criminal profiling. The story follows him live streaming as he solves a murder case.

In 2022, Kang starred in the period adventure film The Pirates: The Last Royal Treasure, a sequel to the blockbuster hit The Pirates. Later the same year, he starred in the JTBC series Insider, playing a judicial trainee who goes undercover in prison to catch a gang leader.

Personal life
Kang began his mandatory military service on September 11, 2017, at Nonsan Korean Army Training Center. The completion ceremony took place on October 24 wherein Kang was recognized for his exemplary performance during basic training. On February 22, 2019, Kang was appointed as honorary ambassador of the Military Manpower Administration (MMA). The ceremony took place at the Air Force Hall in Yeongdeungpo, Seoul. As an honorary ambassador, Kang participated in events organized by the MMA until December 2019. Kang was discharged on May 23, 2019.

Filmography

Film

Television series

Television show

Web show

Music video appearances

Stage

Discography

Awards and nominations

State honors

Listicles

Notes

References

External links

  
 
 
 

21st-century South Korean male actors
South Korean male musical theatre actors
South Korean male stage actors
South Korean male television actors
South Korean male film actors
Chung-Ang University alumni
Living people
1990 births
Male actors from Busan